WHLH is a black gospel station in Jackson, Mississippi, broadcasting at 95.5 FM. It is owned by iHeartMedia, Inc. (formerly Clear Channel Communications until September 2014) and branded "Hallelujah 95.5". The station used to be a CHR station known as WDBT "95.5 The Beat."  Its studios are located in Northwest Jackson and the transmitter site is in Raymond.

External links
Official Website

IHeartMedia radio stations
Gospel radio stations in the United States
HLH
HLH